James B. Rosenwald III (born January 19, 1958) is the co-founder and managing partner of Dalton Investments LLC, an asset management company headquartered in Santa Monica, California, and adjunct professor at Stern School of Business at New York University. He invests in the Pacific Rim area. In 2020, Rosenwald co-founded Activist Japan investment trust Nippon Active Value Fund (NAVF) and launched its IPO.

Early life and education
Rosenwald was born in New York City. He is a brother of designer and ceramic artist Jill Rosenwald, and the first cousin of actress Kyra Sedgwick. Rosenwald attended the Dalton School in Manhattan for 13 years, where he met Steve Persky, his partner at Dalton Investments. He received a B.A. in economics from Vassar College (1980) and an M.B.A. from the Graduate School of Business at New York University (1984). He is a CFA Charterholder since 1987.

Investment career
Rosenwald commenced his investment career at Sterling Grace & Co. While acting as an outside advisor for Soros Fund Management, Rosenwald met Nicholas Roditi, who was also managing money for Soros. In 1992, Rosenwald and Roditi founded and co-managed Rosenwald, Roditi & Company, Ltd., now known as Rovida Asset Management, Ltd. Rosenwald co-founded Dalton Investments in 1999. Dalton's investment style involves holding undervalued stocks for the long term. In particular, it prefers owner-operator companies that align the interests of management and shareholders. Rosenwald is also the chairman and CEO of Rosenwald Capital Management, Inc, a registered investment advisor since 1984. Clients include pensions, endowments, financial services companies, profit sharing plans and high-net-worth individuals.

In addition to security investments, Rosenwald has invested in real estate since 1997. He and Kyle Kazan, co-founded Beach Front Properties, LLC, a real estate investment company based in California. Together, they have invested in residential and commercial properties in the U.S., China, and Germany.

Since 2012, Rosenwald has been an adjunct professor at Stern School of Business at New York University, where he teaches a course on value investing, which he learned from his grandfather who worked for Benjamin Graham, the "Father" of Value Investing, at Graham Newman Corporation.  He and his wife, Laura, make annual contributions to NYU's endowment to fund the Rosenwald Global Value Student Investment Fund. Every year, the fund invests in one or more stocks based on recommendations made by the students in his class.

Public company directorships

Private company directorships / managing member

Social and charitable affiliations
Palos Verdes Country Club (California)
Princeton Club (New York)
The University Club (New York)
Los Angeles Philharmonic:  Board of Overseers
Center Theater Group Artistic Directors Circle (Los Angeles)

References

American hedge fund managers
New York University Stern School of Business alumni
Vassar College alumni
American financial company founders
New York University faculty
1958 births
Living people
CFA charterholders